Claire Angel Mowat (born 5 February 1933) is a Canadian writer and environmentalist.

Personal life
Born on February 5, 1933, Mowat (née Wheeler) was raised and educated in Toronto, Ontario. She graduated from Havergal College and the Ontario College of Art & Design as a Graphic designer and was married to the late author Farley Mowat. The couple divided their time between Ontario, and Cape Breton, Nova Scotia.

Career
Mowat began writing memoirs in the 1960s, leading in 1983 to her first book The Outport People, about the five years she and husband Farley spent at the start of their marriage in the outport Newfoundland community of Burgeo. Her second book Pomp and Circumstances (1989) arose from witnessing protocol behind the scenes at the Governor General's residence Rideau Hall in Ottawa. A 2005 memoir Travels with Farley, describes the couple's life in the Magdalen Islands, following the still-birth of their only child. She has also written a trilogy of young adult fiction: The Girl from Away (1992), The French Isles (1994) and Last Summer in Louisbourg (1998).

Works
  The Outport People (1983)  published by McClelland & Stewart - 
  Pomp and Circumstances (1989)  published by McClelland & Stewart - 
  The Girl from Away (1992)  Illustrated by Malcolm Cullen, published by Key Porter Books - 
  The French Isles (1994)  Illustrated by Huntley Brown, published by Key Porter Books - 
  Last Summer in Louisbourg (1998)  published by Key Porter Books - , (2012) Nimbus Publishing - , 978-1-55109-910-1
  The Girl from Away Trilogy  (2002)  published by Key Porter Books - 
  Travels with Farley (2005) published by Key Porter Books - , (2015) Pottersfield Press -

References

1933 births
Living people
Canadian non-fiction writers
Canadian environmentalists
Canadian women environmentalists
Canadian memoirists
Canadian women novelists
Canadian women memoirists
Canadian women children's writers
People from Northumberland County, Ontario
Writers from Toronto
20th-century Canadian novelists
21st-century Canadian novelists
21st-century Canadian women writers
20th-century Canadian women writers
Claire
Havergal College alumni